Crypto-Islam is the secret adherence to Islam while publicly professing to be of another faith; people who practice crypto-Islam are referred to as "crypto-Muslims." The word has mainly been used in reference to Spanish Muslims and Sicilian Muslims during the Inquisition (i.e., the Moriscos and Saraceni and their usage of Aljamiado). With the Portuguese Empire's expansion to the Far East and the Spanish Empire's spread to the Philippines from Latin America, Filipino Muslims and Portuguese Muslims were also subject to the Inquisition, one famous case being Alexo de Castro of the Spanish-occupied Moluccas; being under trial in another continent away, before the Mexican Inquisition for Crypto-Islam.

Historic examples
Some historic examples include Ahmad ibn Qasim Al-Hajarī, 16th-century crypto-Muslim from Spain who authored a book recounting how he organized his escape from Spain to Morocco, and also including a refutation of the Catholic opinions about Jesus. The books also included details about how crypto-Muslims lived in Spain. He later became Ambassador of Morocco to Spain.

There are claims that Armah, who ruled the Kingdom of Aksum and gave refuge to early Muslim converts, was a crypto-Muslim.

During 16th to late 18th century Russia, the native Muslims of the region faced frequent persecution by the authorities which saw many episodes of forced conversions to Christianity. During these times, the newly converted continued to secretly practice Islam. Once Russia allowed Muslims to practice their faith, many of the converted reverted to Islam.

See also
Crypto-Christianity
Crypto-Judaism
Crypto-paganism
Crypto-Hinduism
Limpieza de sangre
Oran fatwa
Taqiya

References

Bibliography
 
  Rustam Shukurov, "The Crypto-Muslims of Anatolia," in Anthropology, Archeology and Heritage in the Balkans and Anatolia or The Life and Times of F.W. Hasluck (1878-1920), ed. David Shankland, Istanbul: Isis, 2004, volume 2, pages 135–158.

 
Converts to Islam
Moriscos
Passing (sociology)